Roger Tallroth is a retired Swedish wrestler. In 1984 he was an Olympic silver medalist and a European champion in wrestling.

References

External links
 

Olympic wrestlers of Sweden
Olympic medalists in wrestling
Wrestlers at the 1984 Summer Olympics
Wrestlers at the 1988 Summer Olympics
Swedish male sport wrestlers
Olympic silver medalists for Sweden
Living people
Medalists at the 1984 Summer Olympics
1960 births
20th-century Swedish people